Pleasant Lake Stream flows into the Middle Branch Grass River near Newbridge, New York. The Pleasant Lake Stream and Blue Mountain Stream combine here to become Middle Branch Grass River.

References 

Rivers of St. Lawrence County, New York